Vienmēr klusi is the fourth album by Latvian band Dzeltenie Pastnieki, released through magnitizdat in 1984, and 'officially' in 2004.

Track listing
"Vienmēr klusi" (Ingus Baušķenieks/Andris Kalniņš/Mārtiņš Rutkis/Viesturs Slava/Zigmunds Streiķis/Roberts Gobziņš) – 7:08
"Mazais autobuss" (Baušķenieks/Kalniņš/Rutkis/Slava/Streiķis/Hardijs Lediņš/Juris Boiko) – 3:34
"Kāpēc tu man saki 'Jā'?" (Baušķenieks/Kalniņš/Rutkis/Slava/Streiķis/Gobziņš) – 4:29
"Pastnieks trakais" (Baušķenieks/Kalniņš/Rutkis/Slava/Streiķis/Gobziņš) – 1:00
"Mēness deja" (Baušķenieks/Kalniņš/Rutkis/Slava/Streiķis/Lediņš/Boiko) – 7:27
"JJJ - ???" (Baušķenieks/Kalniņš/Rutkis/Slava/Streiķis) – 0:53
"Sliekutēva vaļasprieks" (Baušķenieks/Kalniņš/Rutkis/Slava/Streiķis/Gobziņš) – 3:14
"Parastais pastnieks" (Baušķenieks/Kalniņš/Rutkis/Slava/Streiķis/Lediņš/Boiko) – 4:18
"Čemodāns" (Baušķenieks) – 0:26
"Milžu cīņa" (Baušķenieks/Kalniņš/Rutkis/Slava/Streiķis/Lediņš) – 5:11
"Alise un runcis" (Baušķenieks/Kalniņš/Rutkis/Slava/Streiķis) – 2:04
"Svešā malā" (Baušķenieks/Kalniņš/Rutkis/Slava/Streiķis/Gobziņš) – 4:08

Track details
"Pastnieks trakais" is a different song written around an edited backing track from "Trakais pastnieks" off the album Man ļoti patīk jaunais vilnis (1982). Roberts Gobziņš is on vocals instead of Ingus Baušķenieks.
"JJJ - ???" is a reversed excerpt from "Man ļoti patīk jaunais vilnis", again from the album of the same name.
"Čemodāns" is a brief whistle/guitar reprise of the song from Bolderājas dzelzceļš (1981).

Release history

References

External links 
 Vienmēr Klusi at Discogs

1984 albums
Dzeltenie Pastnieki albums